Alfred Pochopień (19 April 1917 – 7 November 1951) was a Polish footballer. He played in one match for the Poland national football team in 1939.

References

External links
 

1917 births
1951 deaths
Polish footballers
Poland international footballers
Place of birth missing
Association footballers not categorized by position